Allium aciphyllum, cammon name 针叶韭 zhen ye jiu, is a plant species native to Sichuan Province in China. It is found on slopes at elevations of 2000–2100 m.

Allium aciphyllum produces egg-shaped bulbs up to 10 mm in diameter. Scape is round in cross-section, up to 25 cm long, covered with leaf sheaths in lower portion. Leaves are about the same length as the scape. Flowers are pink.

References

External links
Line drawings of Allium cymosum (1-3) and A. aciphyllum (4-7), Flora of China Illustrations vol. 24, fig. 175.

aciphyllum
Onions
Flora of China
Flora of Sichuan
Plants described in 1980